The 2017–18 3. Liga was the tenth season of the 3. Liga. It began on 21 July 2017 and concluded on 12 May 2018.

The fixtures were announced on 4 July 2017.

Teams

Team changes

Stadiums and locations

Personnel and kits

Managerial changes

League table

Results

Top goalscorers

Number of teams by state

References

2017–18 in German football leagues
2017-18
Germ